Sikandar Sultan is a Pakistani entrepreneur and philanthropist who is the founder and now Chairman of Shan Food Industries. In 1981, Sultan was the first person to recognize and take advantage of the potential of launching an independent company that produced hygienic, first-rate packaged recipe mixes and plain spices. During this period, he took the traditional Pakistani national heritage of spice mixes and developed it into a food enterprise.

The company now stands as one of the leading spice companies in Pakistan. Shan Foods Company distributes a range of food items in 60 countries across the globe. The company has manufacturing plants in three locations including Pakistan, Saudi Arabia, and the UAE and also has distribution centers in the United Kingdom and the United States.

Sultan additionally acquired Raani Foods, a UK-based brand. By 2014, according to The Economic Times of India, "Sultan is considered the guru of Pakistan's packaged food industry."

Shan Foods background 
Sikandar Sultan identified a gap in the food industry of Pakistan, where ready-made spice mixes were unheard of and selling loose spices was the norm. He took Pakistan’s cultural heritage of spice mixes to create Shan Foods. From thereon, he led Shan Foods to become the second largest packaged spice mixes and packaged food products company in Pakistan, ranked only behind National Foods Limited. As of 2017, the Company exports its products to more than 60 countries and has annual revenues exceeding Rs. 9 billion. In 2018, he hinted at listing the company on the stock exchange but did not give any firm timeline for an initial public offering.

Achievements 
The Marketing Association of Pakistan (MAP) recognized Sikandar Sultan for his corporate success in 2011 and awarded him as an acclaimed marketing ‘Guru’ of the food industry.

Shan Foods represented Pakistan in the Made in Pakistan exhibition held in India in 2004. The purpose of participating was to further strengthen cultural links between Pakistan and India.

In 2009, Sikandar Sultan received the Karachi Chamber of Commerce & Industry's (KCCI) Best Export Performance Award on 26 September 2009 from the Prime Minister of Pakistan, Yousuf Raza Gilani.

In 2020, he was elected as a council member of the Marketing Association of Pakistan.

References

External links 
 Shan Foods official website
 Shan Foods on YouTube

Pakistani corporate directors
Pakistani Muslims
St. Patrick's High School, Karachi alumni
Businesspeople from Karachi
Pakistani company founders
Pakistani industrialists
Pakistani chief executives
Institute of Business Administration, Karachi alumni
Living people
Year of birth missing (living people)